The Subang Airport Mosque or Masjid Lapangan Terbang Antarabangsa Subang known as Masjid Hijau Subang Airport is a main mosque in Sultan Abdul Aziz Shah Airport in Subang, Selangor, Malaysia. It was built in 1992 and opened on 1994. It is also used as an international mosque for tourists who arrive and depart from Malaysia. When Subang Airport was transferred to Kuala Lumpur International Airport (KLIA) in Sepang on 27 June 1998, it was converted into a public mosque for Muslims from Kampung Subang, Ara Damansara and Saujana.

See also
 Islam in Malaysia

Mosques in Selangor
Mosques completed in 1994
1994 establishments in Malaysia